The 1968–69 Polska Liga Hokejowa season was the 34th season of the Polska Liga Hokejowa, the top level of ice hockey in Poland. 10 teams participated in the league, and Podhale Nowy Targ won the championship.

Final round

Qualification round

External links
 Season on hockeyarchives.info

Polska
Polska Hokej Liga seasons
1968–69 in Polish ice hockey